Perseta stands for Persatuan Sepakbola Tulungagung (en: Football Association of Tulungagung). Perseta Tulungagung is an Indonesian football club, based in Tulungagung Regency, East Java, Indonesia. The club currently plays in Liga 3. Perseta is nicknamed Laskar Badai Selatan (The Southern Storm Warriors), because Tulungagung Regency is located in south coast area of East Java Province, Indonesia.

Achievements & honors
Liga Indonesia Third Division
Winners (1): 2006

References

External links
PT Liga Indonesia official website
 

Tulungagung Regency
Football clubs in East Java
Football clubs in Indonesia
Association football clubs established in 1970
1970 establishments in Indonesia